is a Japanese manga series written and illustrated by Mitsuru Hattori. It was serialized in Kodansha's shōnen manga magazine Weekly Shōnen Magazine from July 2005 to April 2008, with its chapters collected in nine tankōbon volumes. A 13-episode anime television series, produced by Artland and directed by Kōichirō Sōtome, was broadcast from July to September 2007.

Plot
Within the Kanagawa prefecture lies the seaside city of Umineko. He is also the manager of the high school swim team though he himself does not know how to swim. In fact, he is afraid of the water stemming from an incident which occurred some years ago. While he was at the beach, he had nearly drowned when a "mermaid" pulled him under the water. He joined the school's swimming club in order to learn how to swim, but the club is filled with weirdos, who do not teach him swimming.

One day, a floating house arrives at the shores of Umishō bearing two persons. One of these is a cheerful, sunny, happy-go-lucky girl named Amuro Ninagawa, a transfer student, and the other is her father. Her incredible swimming speed makes her an instant hit with the swimming club, but Kaname is surprised, as she reminds him of the mermaid he saw only once in his early childhood. After her floating house is destroyed during a storm she moves to Kaname's house.

Characters

Second year student, and a new transfer student from the Daito Islands, Okinawa at Umishō. Despite her being a dedicated and skilled swimmer, she finds difficulties in performing at competitions due to her not being used to the rules and environment of professional swimming (for instance, in her first attempt at swimming in a pool, she bumped her head on the pool's edge on the opposite end from where she started, and cried for some time from the headache, since she was used to swimming in the open ocean). Among her other uncommon habits, she prefers swimming nude, and has no shame of doing so, especially around Kaname.

Second year student, and the swimming team's manager. He had a traumatic experience involving a creature he describes as a mermaid during his childhood, and after which he has been afraid of swimming ever since. However this scenario started to change after Amuro's arrival at Umishō. Always in trouble due to Amuro's unpredictable behavior, he usually denies his growing feelings for her.

Third year student, and vice-captain of the swimming team. The most rational and serious character, she serves as the straight man of most characters and cannot stand the antics of Masa.

A first year student, nicknamed . Too small for her age, she is usually mistaken as a junior high student. Despite being a member of the swimming team, she is still learning how to properly swim by taking lessons from Kaname.

Team Captain, nicknamed Ikamasa. Third year, muscle-bound, and obsessed with shaving his and other people's body hair, and with wearing revealing Speedo bikini swim suits. He is, in fact, the most annoying character of the swim team, driving most of the characters crazy from his antics.

A second year. Admired by the boys, she is very self-conscious when people stare at her. Her secret promiscuity is a recurring gag in the series: she wears skimpy lingerie under her clothes, she has a collection of kokeshis (Japanese dolls) in her bedroom and although she does not like people looking at her, she likes to look at members of the opposite sex or anything that resembles them (ie a giant statue or a large horn). It is revealed when Kaname goes to her house that apparently she got this sexual behavior from her parents, who often engage in sexual roleplay. She is a very skilled swimmer as she almost won the Kantou Tournament in 200 meters the year before the series starts. Her grandfather is the creator of the Shizu Group. She also has feelings for Kaname, however it is uncertain.

First year student. A famous swimmer and model who transfers to Umishō in order to get close to Kaname, for whom she has had a crush since childhood. She considers Amuro as a rival and competes with her for Kaname's attention. She has a noticeable small fang and wears a swimsuit different from the rest of the team. Like Maki she has small breasts, and has a huge contempt for girls with big breasts like Amuro and Mirei. She forms an "Alliance" with Maki to help make their breasts grow.

A third year student. A co-founder of Umisho's swimming club and Momoko's childhood friend. Usually tends to bring trouble to those around her. She also makes up stories and lies just to tease others, and to also gain other guys attention.

Media

Manga
Written and illustrated by Mitsuru Hattori, Kenkō Zenrakei Suieibu Umishō was serialized in Kodansha's shōnen manga magazine Weekly Shōnen Magazine from July 13, 2005, to April 23, 2008. Kodansha collected its 129 chapters in nine tankōbon volumes, released from January 17, 2006, to June 17, 2008.

Anime
A 13-episode anime television series animated by Artland, directed by Kōichirō Sōtome and written by Mamiko Ikeda, was broadcast on Tokyo MX, TVS, Chiba TV, TV Aichi, and TVO from July 4 to September 26, 2007.

Episode list

Internet radio
An internet radio version of the anime series, was first streamed on the Japanese websites Ōnsen and BEWE from May 16 to June 27, 2007. A continuation, began streaming on July 4, 2007. The first version of the series featured Hitomi Nabatame, voice actor of Momoko Orizuka, while the continuation featured Nabatame and Aki Toyosaki, voice actor of Amuro Ninagawa.

Video game
A video game developed by 5pb. Inc., titled , was released for the PlayStation 2 on November 22, 2007.

Notes

References

External links 
  
 Umisho video game page 
 

Artland (company)
Kodansha manga
Mitsuru Hattori
Romantic comedy anime and manga
Shōnen manga
Swimming in anime and manga